Morozov may refer to:
Morozov (crater), a lunar crater
Morozov (surname), people with the surname Morozov

See also
Kharkiv Morozov Machine Building Design Bureau (KMDB), a Ukrainian state-owned tank design bureau
Pavlik Morozov (1918–1932), play by Ukrainian writer Les Podervyansky
Morozovsky (disambiguation)